"Single-Bilingual" is a song by English synth-pop duo Pet Shop Boys, released on 11 November 1996 as the third single from their sixth studio album, Bilingual (1996). The track peaked at number 14 on the UK Singles Chart.

The song is named "Single" on the album version, but was retitled "Single-Bilingual" because Everything but the Girl also had a song named "Single" which had been released the previous May. The album version cross-fades with the previous track, "Discoteca", and the accompanying music video contains an interpolation of the aforementioned song at the end.

Critical reception
A reviewer from Music Week rated the song three out of five, adding, "The album has fallen from the Top 75, but this class single — devastatingly detailing the life of an upwardly-mobile Euro-executive — should return it to the forefront."

Music video
The accompanying music video features Neil Tennant as a glib businessman travelling across Europe and trying to pick up a woman in a bar. Towards the end, the visuals feature military aircraft suggesting that he is in fact an arms trader.

Track listings
UK CD single 1: Parlophone CDRS 6452
 "Single-Bilingual"
 "Discoteca" (New version)
 "The Calm Before the Storm"
 "Discoteca" (Trouser Enthusiast's Adventures Beyond the Stellar Empire Mix)

UK CD single 2: Parlophone CDR 6452
 "Discoteca" (Pet Shop Boys extended mix) – 6:58
 "Confidential" (1992 demo for Tina Turner) – 4:46
 "Single-Bilingual" (Baby Doc mix) – 5:44
 "Discoteca" (Baby Doc mix)

UK cassette single TCR6452
 "Single-Bilingual"
 "Discoteca"

Charts

References

1996 singles
Pet Shop Boys songs
1996 songs
Songs written by Neil Tennant
Songs written by Chris Lowe
Parlophone singles
Music videos directed by Howard Greenhalgh